Quest Development Corporation was a small, privately held software development company founded by serial entrepreneur Kevin Azzouz in San Luis Obispo, California that primarily developed backup and storage management software which was licensed as The Norton Backup to Symantec Corporation in the late 1980s and early 1990s. Formed in Azzouz's condominium apartment just before the heyday of technology company mergers and acquisitions during the 1990s, the original Quest operation became part of Astora Software, Arcada Software, Seagate Software, Veritas Software and Symantec.

The operation continued to develop data-protection software in San Luis Obispo until April 2008, when Symantec finally closed the site and relocated most of its remaining personnel to their Orem, Utah, Mountain View, California and Heathrow, Florida facilities. A small fragment of the original backup software operation remains in San Luis Obispo at Sonic Solutions, located just down the street from the now-defunct site. Sonic acquired the Desktop and Mobile Division from Veritas in November 2002.

Quest's founder Azzouz was president, and Lennart Mengwall, his mentor and long-time business partner, was chairman.

Symantec initially contracted with Quest to develop Norton Backup for MS-DOS and then for Microsoft Windows. Quest retained exclusive ownership of all source code it developed, while Symantec retained exclusive marketing rights over the software. To provide a backup solution for the Norton Utilities for Macintosh suite, Quest acquired FastBack for Macintosh from Fifth Generation Systems, bringing its principal author, Tom Chappell, into the company as well. The relationship between Fifth Generation Systems and the principals of Quest was not always harmonious; it spawned litigation, with Quest prevailing after the discovery process led to dismissal by the court.

In January 1993, Quest paid Symantec to terminate their development contract, then immediately licensed their backup software to several tape drive vendors, a step that generated a substantial amount of revenue. These funds allowed Azzouz and Mengwall to position the company for a merger, in spite of severe restrictions that Symantec had placed on Quest as part of their separation agreement. Although Symantec had produced a long list of specifically named companies that were effectively taken off the table as merger partners, company leaders at Symantec led by Enrique Salem failed to see the potential competition from a hardware company such as Conner Peripherals, and so Azzouz and Mengwall were able to arrange a merger between Quest and the Conner software division, Conner Software of Lake Mary, Florida, the producer of Backup Exec, to form Arcada Software.

Astora Software was the name given to the transitional company that was formed after Quest bought out its development contract with Symantec, but before the founding of its successor company, Arcada. It was in existence for only a two-week period during 1994.

Mengwall was bought out during the merger and was not kept on as a principal of Arcada Software. Azzouz became president of Arcada Software.

References

Defunct software companies of the United States
Companies based in San Luis Obispo County, California
Defunct companies based in California
Gen Digital acquisitions